The zebra top snail, scientific name Austrocochlea porcata, is a medium-sized sea snail, a marine gastropod mollusc in the family Trochidae, the top snails, also known as top shells.

Shell description
The size of the shell varies between 20 mm and 43 mm. The shell has a  black-and-white banded pattern overlying a light grey to white shell. It is very similar to that of the southern ribbed top snail, Austrocochlea constricta, and until recently the two species were considered to be identical. The aperture is less dilated, than in Austrocochlea constricta. The columellar tubercle is obsolete.

Distribution
This marine species is endemic to Australia and occurs off Central Queensland to Western Australia and also off Tasmania.

References

Life on Australian Seashores - www.mesa.edu.au
 Donald K.M., Kennedy M. & Spencer H.G. (2005) The phylogeny and taxonomy of austral monodontine topshells (Mollusca: Gastropoda: Trochidae), inferred from DNA sequences. Molecular Phylogenetics and Evolution 37: 474-483

External links
 

porcata
Gastropods of Australia
Gastropods described in 1853